Alice Roberts (29 July 190629 October 1985) was a Belgian actress active from the late 1920s to the late 1930s.

She may be best-remembered in Georg Wilhelm Pabst's silent German film Pandora's Box (1929). The film was memorable due to the overt lesbian overtures between Roberts' character, the Countess Geschwitz, and Louise Brooks's character, Lulu. Some scholars count her performance "one of the first cinematic representations not only of lesbian desire, but of an explicitly queer female masculinity."  

The film was based on Frank Wedekind's plays Earth Spirit and Pandora’s Box.

Alice Roberts died in 1985, aged 79, in Belgium.

Filmography

References

External links

1906 births
1985 deaths
Belgian silent film actresses
Place of death missing
Place of birth missing
20th-century Belgian actresses
Belgian film actresses